The Ancient Egyptian Pharaoh Ramesses II had a large number of children: between 48 to 50 sons, and 40 to 53 daughters – whom he had depicted on several monuments. 

Ramesses apparently made no distinctions between the offspring of his first two principal wives, Nefertari and Isetnofret. Both queens' firstborn sons and first few daughters had statues at the entrance of the Greater Abu Simbel temple, although only Nefertari's children were depicted in the smaller temple, dedicated to her. Other than Nefertari and Isetnofret, Ramesses had six more great royal wives during his reign – his own daughters Bintanath, Meritamen, Nebettawy and Henutmire (who, according to another theory was his sister), and two daughters of Hattusili III, King of Hatti. Except the first Hittite princess Maathorneferure and possibly Bintanath, none are known to have borne children to the pharaoh.

The first few children of Ramesses usually appear in the same order on depictions. Lists of princes and princesses were found in the Ramesseum, Luxor, Wadi es-Sebua and Abydos. Some names are known to us from ostraka, tombs and other sources. The sons of Ramses appear on depictions of battles and triumphs–such as the Battle of Kadesh and the siege of the Syrian city of Dapur–already early in his reign (Years 5 and 10, respectively), thus it is likely that several of them were born before he ascended to the throne. Many of his sons were buried in the tomb KV5.

Ramesses' efforts to have his children depicted on several of his monuments are in contradiction with the earlier tradition of keeping royal children, especially boys in the background unless they held important official titles. This was probably caused by the fact that his family was not of royal origin and he wanted to stress their royal status.

Sons 
 Amunherkhepeshef (“Amun Is with His Strong Arm”), firstborn son of Nefertari; crown prince until his death in Year 26. He is likely to be the same person as Seth-her-khepeshef or Sethirkopshef.
 Ramesses (“Born of Rê”), eldest son of Isetnofret, crown prince between Years 25 and 50.
 Pareherwenemef (“Re Is with His Right Arm”), Nefertari's second son. Appears on depictions of the triumph after the Battle of Kadesh and in the smaller Abu-Simbel temple. He was never crown prince; it is likely he predeceased his elder brothers.
 Khaemweset (“He who appears/appeared in Thebes”), Isetnofret's second son, "the first Egyptologist", crown prince until about the 55th year.
 Mentu-her-khepeshef or Montuhirkhopshef or Mentuherwenemef (“Menthu Is with His Strong/Right Arm”) was mentioned on a stela from Bubastis. A statue of him is in Copenhagen. He was present at the siege of Dapur.
 Nebenkharu
 Meryamun or Ramesses-Meryamun (“Beloved of Amun”) was present at the triumph and the siege; was buried in KV5 where fragments of his canopic jars were found.
 Amunemwia or Sethemwia (“Amun/Seth in the Divine Barque”) also appears at Dapur. He changed his name from Amunemwia to Sethemwia around the same time when his eldest brother changed it.
 Sethi was also present at Kadesh and Dapur. He was buried in KV5 – where two of his canopic jars were found – around Year 53. On his funerary equipment his name is spelled Sutiy. He might have been identical with another Sethi, mentioned on an ostrakon which is now in the Egyptian Museum in Cairo.
 Setepenre (“Chosen of Re”) was present at Dapur too.
 Meryre (“Beloved of Re”) was the son of Nefertari. It is likely that he died at a young age; a brother of his (18th on the list of princes) was probably named after him.
 Horherwenemef (“Horus Is with His Right Arm”) 
 Merneptah (“Beloved of Ptah”), son of Isetnofret, crown prince after the 55th year, then pharaoh.
 Amenhotep (“Amun Is Pleased”)
 Itamun (“Amun Is The Father”)
 Meryatum (“Beloved of Atum”), son of Nefertari. High Priest of Heliopolis.
 Nebentaneb/Nebtaneb (“Lord of All Lands”)
 Meryre
 Amunemopet (“Amun on the Opet Feast”)
 Senakhtenamun (“Amun Gives Him Strength”) is likely to have been resided in Memphis, as it is suggested by a votive plaque belonging to his servant Amenmose.
 Ramesses-Merenre
 Djehutimes/Thutmose (“Born of Thoth”)
 Simentu (“Son of Mentu”) was the overseer of the royal vineyards in Memphis. He was married to Iryet, daughter of a Syrian captain, Benanath.
 Mentuemwaset (“Mentu in Thebes”)
 Siamun (“Son of Amon”)
 (Ramesses)-Siptah (“Son of Ptah”) was probably the son of a secondary wife called Sutererey. A relief of them is in the Louvre. A Book of the Dead, which was probably his, is now in Florence.
 Unknown
 Mentuenheqau ("Mentu is with the rulers")

The following sons of Ramses are known from various sources other than lists:

 Astarteherwenemef (“Astarte Is with His Right Arm”) is shown on a stone block originally from the Ramesseum, reused in Medinet Habu. His name shows Asian influence like that of Bintanath and Mahiranath.
 Geregtawy (“Peace of the Two Lands”) is known from a stone block, from the Ramesseum, reused in Medinet Habu.
 Merymontu (“Beloved of Menthu”) was depicted in Wadi es-Sebua and Abydos.
 Neben[…] is mentioned on an ostrakon in Cairo.
 [Ramesses-…]pare is the 20th on the Abydos procession of princes, which shows a slightly different order of them.
 Ramesses-Maatptah (“Justice of Ptah”) is only known from a letter, in which the palace servant Meryotef rebukes him.
 Ramesses-Meretmire ("Loving like Re") is the 48th on the Wadi es-Sebua procession.
 Ramesses-Meryamun-Nebweben is known from his coffin's inscriptions.
 Ramesses-Meryastarte (“Beloved of Astarte”) is the 26th in the Abydos procession.
 Ramesses-Merymaat (“Beloved of Maat”) is the 25th in the Abydos procession.
 Ramesses-Meryseth (“Beloved of Seth”) is known from a stone block from the Ramesseum, reused in Medinet Habu. He is the 23rd in the Abydos procession and is named on a stela, a door lintel and on a doorjamb.
 Ramesses-Paitnetjer ("The priest") is known from a Cairo ostrakon.
 Ramesses-Siatum (“Son of Atum”) is the 19th in the Abydos procession.
 Ramesses-Sikhepri ("Son of Khepri") is the 24th in the Abydos procession.
 (Ramesses)-Userkhepesh (“Strong of Arm”) is the 22nd in the Abydos procession.
 Ramesses-Userpehti ("Strong of strength") is probably a son of Ramesses II. He is mentioned on a Memphis statue and on a plaque.
 Seshnesuen[…] and Sethemhir[…] are mentioned on a Cairo ostrakon.
 [Seth]emnakht ("Seth as the champion") and Shepsemiunu ("The noble one in Heliopolis") are known from stone blocks from the Ramesseum, reused in Medinet Habu. [Seth]emnakht is also mentioned on a doorway.
 Wermaa[…] is mentioned on a Cairo ostrakon.

Daughters
It is harder to determine the birth order of the daughters than that of the sons. The first ten of them usually appear in the same order. Many of the princesses are known to us only from Abydos and from ostraka. The six eldest princesses have statues at the entrance of the Greater Abu Simbel temple.

 Bintanath (“Daughter of Anath”), daughter of Isetnofret, later Great Royal Wife.
 Baketmut (“Handmaid of Mut”)
 Nefertari, possibly the wife of Amun-her-khepeshef.
 Meritamen (“Beloved of Amun”) is Nefertari's daughter, later Great Royal Wife. She is probably the best known of Ramesses' daughters.
 Nebettawy (“Lady of the Two Lands”) later became Great Royal Wife.
 Isetnofret (“The beautiful Isis”) is also known from a letter in which two singers inquire after her health. It is possible she was identical with Merenptah's wife Isetnofret, but it is also possible that Merenptah's wife was Khaemwaset's daughter, also called Isetnofret.
 Henuttawy (“Mistress of the Two Lands”) was Nefertari's daughter.
 Werenro
 Nedjemmut (“Mut is Sweet”) 
 Pypuy is likely to be identical with a lady who was the daughter of Iwy and was reburied with a group of 18th dynasty princesses in Sheikh Abd el-Qurna.

From the Luxor procession of daughters: Nebetiunet (“Lady of Denderah”, 11.), Renpetnefer/Parerenpetnefer (12.), Merytkhet (13.), Nebet[…]h[…]a (14.), Mut-Tuya (15.), Meritptah (“Beloved of Ptah”, 16.)

From the Abydos procession: Nubher[…] (18.), Shehiryotes (19.), Henut[…] (20.), Merytmihapi (“Beloved like Hapi”, 22.), Meritites (“Beloved by Her Father”, 23.), Nubemiunu (24.), Henutsekhemu (“Mistress of Powers”, 25.), Henutpahuro[…] (26.), Neferure (“Beauty of Re”, daughter of Maathorneferure, 31.), Merytnetjer (“Beloved of the God”, 32.), […]khesbed (16. on the second Abydos procession)

From Wadi es-Sebua: Henutpare[…] (58.), Nebetnehat (59.), 

From a Louvre ostrakon: […]taweret (3.), Henuttaneb (“Mistress of All Lands”, 4.), Tuya (5.), Henuttadesh (6.), Hetepenamun (“Peace of Amun”, 7.), Nebetimmunedjem (8.), Henuttamehu (“Lady of Lower Egypt”, 9.), Nebetananash (10.), Sitamun (“Daughter of Amun”, 11.), Tia-Sitre (“Daughter of Re”, 12.), Tuya-Nebettawy (13.), Takhat (probably identical with the wife of Sethi II; 14.), Nubemweskhet (15.)

See also
Nineteenth Dynasty of Egypt family tree

References

Sources

External links
List based on K.A.Kitchen's work (by Anneke Bart)

Ramses II
Ramses II
Ramesses II
Ramesses II